Solohead GAA is a Gaelic Athletic Association hurling and gaelic football club located in Solohead, in West County Tipperary in Ireland. The club is located north of Tipperary Town.

Honours
West Tipperary Senior Football Championship:
Winner (4): 1956, 1957, 1970, 1977West Tipperary Senior Hurling ChampionshipWinner (2): 1957 (St. Nicholas -included Glengar, Cappa & Solohead), 1963 (as St. Patrick's included Solohead & Lattin-Cullen)West Tipperary Intermediate Hurling Championship:
Winner (3): 1979, 1981, 1987West Tipperary Junior A Football Championship:
 Winner (4): 1954, 1955, 1966, 1998Tipperary Junior B Football Championship :
 Winner (1): 2018
 West Tipperary Junior B Football Championship:
 Winner (2): 1996, 2018
 Tipperary Junior A Hurling Championship:
 Winner (2): 1938, 1959
 West Tipperary Junior A Hurling Championship:
 Winner (7): 1938, 1949, 1953, 1955, 1959, 1970, 1975West Tipperary Junior B Hurling Championship:
 Winner 2006, 2022West Tipperary Under-21 A Football Championship:
 Winner 1961 (with Lattin-Cullen), 1962 (with Lattin-Cullen), 1963 (with Lattin-Cullen), 1964 (with Lattin-Cullen), 1965, 1966, 1968Tipperary Under-21 C Football Championship:
 Winner 2004West Tipperary Under-21 C Football Championship:
 Winner 2001
 South Tipperary Junior A Hurling Championship''':
 Winner (2): 1925, 1926 (with Arravale Rovers)

References

External links
GAA Info Page
Tipperary GAA site

Gaelic games clubs in County Tipperary
Hurling clubs in County Tipperary
Gaelic football clubs in County Tipperary